Carlos Rodolfo Abaunza Balladares (born 11 January 1986) is a Nicaraguan sprinter. He competed in the men's 100 metres at the 2004 Summer Olympics.

References

External links
 

1986 births
Living people
Athletes (track and field) at the 2004 Summer Olympics
Nicaraguan male sprinters
Olympic athletes of Nicaragua
Sportspeople from San José, Costa Rica
Central American Games silver medalists for Nicaragua
Central American Games medalists in athletics